James Richard Bartholomew (born 30 June 1941) is an American historian, who specializes in the modern history of Japan.

He studied at Stanford University where he was awarded a B.A. in 1963, an M.A. in 1964 and a Ph.D. in 1972.

He was awarded a Guggenheim Fellowship in 2001, and was elected a Fellow of the American Association for the Advancement of Science in 2007.

He is currently Emeritus Professor at Ohio State University.

His work focuses on East Asian history; the environment, technology, and science; and religion in history.

Published works
1989: The Formation of Science in Japan: Building a Research Tradition (awarded the 1992 Pfizer Award of the History of Science Society)

References

1941 births
Living people
Stanford University School of Humanities and Sciences alumni
Fellows of the American Association for the Advancement of Science
Ohio State University faculty
21st-century American historians
21st-century American male writers
American male non-fiction writers